Bancorp Montana Holding Company was formed from Montana Business Capital Corporation and is the holding company for Bank of Montana. Bancorp Montana Holding Company has 6 Directors: Tom Swenson - President, Mark Bretz, Tony Crawford, David Bell, Ron Taylor, and Bill Woody.

References

Banks based in Montana